Lõpe is a village in Lääneranna Parish, Pärnu County in southwestern Estonia.

Lõpe is the location of Lõpe pig farm that accommodates 7,050 pigs. It is owned by OÜ Lõpe Agro and produces pigs for Rakvere Lihakombinaat.

References

Villages in Pärnu County